Carlo Savina (2 August 1919 - 23 June 2002) was an Italian composer and conductor who composed, arranged, and conducted music for films, and is especially remembered for being the music director of films such as The Godfather (1972), Amarcord (1973), and The Bear (1988).

Savina worked with many of the notable film score composers of the 20th century including: Ennio Morricone, Armando Trovajoli, Nino Rota, Mario Nascimbene, Stanley Myers, Stephen Sondheim, Philippe Sarde, and Miklos Rozsa. His work ranged from composing music for frequent Spaghetti Westerns such as Johnny Oro to being the musical director and conductor in Federico Fellini's Orchestra Rehearsal.

In 1985 he won the David di Donatello Best Music award for the film score of Pizza Connection.

Biography
Carlo Savina came from a musical family—his father was the first clarinettist for the orchestra of an Italian public radio broadcaster EIAR. Carlo learned the violin as a child and went on to graduate from the Conservatory of Music Giuseppe Verdi in Turin where he studied piano, violin, composition, and conducting. In 1945 he began composing music for radio.  Early in his career, he was awarded a prize by the Accademia Musicale Chigiana.  He started his own orchestra and soon was famous.  In 1950 he began composing and arranging music for film. For the next thirty years, he composed, arranged, and conducted music for over 200 films and became one of the most prolific, and perhaps underrated, screen and television composers of the 20th century.

Selected filmography

 1954 Toto Seeks Peace 
 1955 Girls of Today
 1958 Herod the Great
 1959 Head of a Tyrant 
 1960 It Started in Naples
 1960 Ferragosto in bikini
 1961 A Difficult Life
 1962 War Gods of Babylon
 1962 The Fury of Achilles
 1962 Samson Against the Sheik
 1962 Eva
 1962 The Rebel Gladiators
 1963 Slave Queen of Babylon
 1963 The Motorized
 1963 Hercules Against the Mongols
 1964 Hercules Against the Barbarians
 1964 Spartacus and the Ten Gladiators
 1964 Terror in the Crypt
 1965 Gli amanti latini
 1965 Secret Agent Fireball
 1965 Bullet in the Flesh
 1965 Här kommer bärsärkarna
 1965 Veneri al sole
 1966 Mutiny at Fort Sharpe
 1966 The Man Who Laughs
 1966 Bob Fleming... Mission Casablanca
 1966 Goldsnake
 1966 Johnny Oro
 1966 Few Dollars for Django
 1967 Massacre in the Black Forest
 1967 A Pact with the Devil
 1968 The Young, the Evil and the Savage
 1968 A Long Ride from Hell
 1968 Franco, Ciccio And The Cheerful Widows
 1968 Vengeance
 1968 Between God, the Devil and a Winchester
 1969 The Unnaturals
 1969 Heads or Tails 
 1969 Malenka
 1970 And God Said to Cain
 1970 A Suitcase for a Corpse
 1970 Mr. Superinvisible
 1970 Hey Amigo! A Toast to Your Death
 1971 Nights And Loves Of Don Juan
 1971 The Last Traitor
 1971 The Feast of Satan
 1971 Eye of the Spider
 1971 Stress (1971 film)
 1972 Naked Girl Killed in the Park
 1972 1001 Nights Of Pleasure
 1973 Love and Anarchy
 1973 Mr. Hercules Against Karate
 1973 The Legend of Blood Castle
 1973 Macadam Jungle
 1974 I figli di nessuno
 1974 The Killer Reserved Nine Seats
 1974 Lisa and the Devil
 1974 The Stranger and the Gunfighter
 1975 L'ingenua
 1975 A Diary of a Murderess
 1975 Reflections in Black
 1975 Savage Man Savage Beast
 1977 Nine Guests for a Crime
 1978 Suggestionata
 1978 Fury
 1978 The Perfect Crime
 1978 Obscene Desire
 1981 Comin' at Ya!
 1982 Hunters of the Golden Cobra
 1985 Pizza Connection

References

External links
 
 Carlo Savina Discography at CD Universe
 Carlo Savina at AllMusic
 Carlo Savina at Discogs

Musicians from Turin
Italian film score composers
Italian male film score composers
Italian male conductors (music)
1919 births
2002 deaths
Spaghetti Western composers
David di Donatello winners
20th-century Italian conductors (music)
20th-century Italian male musicians